Ryszard Białous codename: Jerzy (b. 4 April 1914 in Warsaw - 24 March 1992 in Neuquen, Argentina) was a Polish scoutmaster (harcmistrz) captain of the AK-Szare Szeregi. Commander of the Batalion Zośka before and during the Warsaw Uprising. He was also known under the noms de guerre   "Zygmunt" and "Taran".

Awards
 Virtuti Militari, V class
 Krzyż Walecznych, three times

References

1914 births
1992 deaths
Home Army members
Polish Scouts and Guides
Polish Army officers